Former Local government areas (LGAs) in the Australian state of Tasmania are amalgamated or cancelled areas.

Tasmania has had a large number of former LGAs.

In 1907, 149 LGAs were reduced by mergers and amalgamation to 53 LGAs. By the time of a large scale overhaul in 1993, 46 LGAs were reduced to 29 LGAs.

The list below is incomplete:

 Municipality of Beaconsfield

 Municipality of Bothwell
 Bruny Island Council

 Municipality of Emu Bay

 Municipality of Campbell Town
 Municipality of Deloraine
 Municipality of Esperance

 Municipality of Evandale
 Fingal Municipal Council

 Municipality of Glamorgan
 Municipality of Gormanston Now incorporated into West Coast Council.
 Municipality of Green Ponds

 Municipality of Hamilton

 Municipality of Huon
 Municipality of Lilydale

 Municipality of Longford
 Municipality of New Norfolk

 Municipality of Oatlands

 Municipality of Penguin
 Municipality of Port Cygnet
 Portland Council

 Municipality of Queenborough
 Municipality of Queenstown Now incorporated into West Coast Council.

 Municipality of Richmond
 Municipality of Ringarooma
 Municipality of Ross
 Municipality of Scottsdale
 Municipality of St Leonards
 Municipality of Spring Bay
 Municipality of Strahan Now incorporated into West Coast Council
 Municipality of Ulverstone (formerly Municipality of Leven)
 Municipality of Waratah
 Municipality of Wynyard (formerly called Table Cape Council)
 Municipality of Westbury
 Municipality of Zeehan Now incorporated into West Coast Council.

See also

 List of localities in Tasmania
 Local government areas of Tasmania
 Divisions of the Australian House of Representatives#Tasmania

References

External links 
 

 
Local government
Regions of Tasmania